Duchy of Trakai was a subdivision of the Grand Duchy of Lithuania during the 14th and early 15th centuries. The Duke of Trakai was an important position held either by the Grand Duke of Lithuania himself or his second-in-command.

History
After the demise of Gediminas in December 1337, the Duchy of Lithuania was divided into two parts: Grand Duke Algirdas ruled Vilnius and the Eastern Aukštaitija while his brother Kęstutis received the Duchy of Trakai.

Lithuanian Civil Wars

1381–1384
In 1382, during the Lithuanian Civil War, Kęstutis was imprisoned at the Kreva Castle and died. His nephew Skirgaila was named the new Duke of Trakai by his brother Grand Duke Jogaila.

1389–1392
Vytautas, son of Kęstutis, then waged a new Lithuanian Civil War to regain his patrimony in Trakai and seize power in Lithuania. The war was ended by the Ostrów Agreement on August 4, 1392. The agreement transferred the Duchy from Skirgaila to Vytautas.

Union of Horodło in 1413
On October 2, 1413, Vilnius and Trakai Voivodeships were created by the Union of Horodło from the Duchy of Trakai. The voivodeships were ruled by an appointed official and not by the dukes.

Geography
One could delineate the boundaries of the Duchy of Trakai by referring to the donative writ of Grand Duke Jogaila: from the Livonian border (Upytė) to Kobrynin (Masuria), and eastward from Podlesie to Pinsk. Naugardukas was still part of the Duchy of Trakai.

Dukes of Trakai

Bibliography
 A. Prochaska, Codex Epistolaris Vitoldi, p. 3
 Memorandum of the Eastern and Southern Boundaries of Ethnographic Lithuania May 23, 1967

Principalities of the Grand Duchy of Lithuania